Laevisoolithus is an oogenus of fossil egg. Its sole oospecies, L. sochavai, is native to the Nemegt Formation in Mongolia. Laevisoolithus is characterized by its thin, smooth eggshells. These eggs were probably laid by a bird or a small theropod.

References

Dinosaur reproduction
Egg fossils
Maastrichtian life
Late Cretaceous birds of Asia
Fossils of Mongolia
Nemegt Formation
Fossil parataxa described in 1991